Leningrad manuscript may refer to:
Saint Petersburg Bede, formerly known as the Leningrad Bede, an Anglo-Saxon illuminated manuscript, a near-contemporary version of Bede's 8th century history Historia ecclesiastica gentis Anglorum (Ecclesiastical History of the English People)
Leningrad Codex, the oldest complete manuscript of the Hebrew Bible in Hebrew, using the masoretic text and Tiberian vocalization